The Kingsbury family is a family involved in colonial and frontier settlement of the United States, and influential in England.  The Kingsbury family derived their toponymic surname from having held Kingsbury, Warwickshire.

See also
 Aston Hall
 Kingsbury Hall

English families
Kingsbury, Warwickshire
English gentry families